Paul Ramadier (17 March 1888 in La Rochelle – 14 October 1961 in Rodez) was a French statesman.

Biography 
The son of a psychiatrist, Ramadier graduated in law from the University of Toulouse and started his profession as a lawyer in Paris. Then, in 1911, he gained his doctorate in Roman law. He became the mayor of Decazeville in 1919 and served as the first Prime Minister of the Fourth Republic in 1947.

On 10 July 1940, he voted against the granting of the full powers to Marshal Philippe Pétain, who installed the Vichy regime the next day.

Ramadier took part in the Resistance and used the nom de guerre Violette. His name was included in the Yad Vashem Jewish memorial after the war.

In the government of Charles de Gaulle (1944–1945), he was Minister for Provisions and earned a reputation as a hardworker, pragmatic and conciliatory politician.

It was during his first ministry that the French Communist Party was forced out of the government in May 1947, which ended the coalition of "tripartisme" with the French Section of the Workers' International (SFIO). Ramadier voted for the Marshall Plan.

From 1956 to 1957, Ramadier was Minister of Finance under Guy Mollet.

Governments

First Ministry (22 January – 22 October 1947)
Paul Ramadier – President of the Council
Maurice Thorez – Vice President of the Council
Georges Bidault – Minister of Foreign Affairs
Paul Coste-Floret – Minister of War
Louis Jacquinot – Minister of Marine
André Maroselli – Minister of Air
Édouard Depreux – Minister of the Interior
Robert Schuman – Minister of Finance
André Philip – Minister of National Economy
Robert Lacoste – Minister of Industrial Production
Ambroise Croizat – Minister of Labour and Social Security
André Marie – Minister of Justice
Marcel Edmond Naegelen – Minister of National Education
François Mitterrand – Minister of Veterans and War Victims
François Tanguy-Prigent – Minister of Agriculture
Pierre Bourdan – Minister of Youth, Arts, and Letters
Marius Moutet – Minister of Overseas France
Jules Moch – Minister of Public Works and Transport
Georges Marrane – Minister of Public Health and Population
Charles Tillon – Minister of Reconstruction and Town Planning.
Jean Letourneau – Minister of Commerce
Félix Gouin – Minister of Planning
Marcel Roclore – Minister of State
Yvon Delbos – Minister of State

Changes:
4 May 1947 – Pierre-Henri Teitgen succeeds Thorez as Vice President of the Council. The other Communist ministers (Croizat, Marranne, and Tillon) also resign.
9 May 1947 – Daniel Mayer succeeds Croizat as Minister of Labour and Social Security. Robert Prigent succeeds Marranne as Minister of Public Health and Population. Jean Letourneau succeeds Tillon as Minister of Reconstruction and Town Planning. Eugène Thomas enters the Cabinet as Minister of Posts.
11 August 1947 – Robert Lacoste succeeds Letourneau as Minister of Commerce, becoming thus Minister of Commerce and Industry.

Second Ministry (22 October – 24 November 1947)
Paul Ramadier – President of the Council
Georges Bidault – Minister of Foreign Affairs
Pierre-Henri Teitgen – Minister of National Defense
Édouard Depreux – Minister of the Interior
Robert Schuman – Minister of Finance
Jules Moch – Minister of Economic Affairs, Planning, Public Works, Transport, Reconstruction, and Town Planning
Robert Lacoste – Minister of Industry
André Marie – Minister of Justice
Marcel Edmond Naegelen – Minister of National Education
Daniel Mayer – Minister of Social Affairs, Veterans, and War Victims
Marcel Roclore – Minister of Agriculture
Paul Coste-Floret – Minister of Overseas France
Yvon Delbos – Minister of State

References

External links
 Paul Ramadier – his activity to save Jews' lives during the Holocaust, at Yad Vashem website
 

1888 births
1961 deaths
People from La Rochelle
Politicians from Nouvelle-Aquitaine
French Section of the Workers' International politicians
Socialist Party of France – Jean Jaurès Union politicians
Socialist Republican Union politicians
Prime Ministers of France
French Ministers of Justice
French Ministers of Finance
Members of the 14th Chamber of Deputies of the French Third Republic
Members of the 15th Chamber of Deputies of the French Third Republic
Members of the 16th Chamber of Deputies of the French Third Republic
Members of the Constituent Assembly of France (1945)
Members of the Constituent Assembly of France (1946)
Deputies of the 1st National Assembly of the French Fourth Republic
Deputies of the 3rd National Assembly of the French Fourth Republic
The Vichy 80
Human Rights League (France) members
History of Madagascar
French Righteous Among the Nations